16 Cygni Bb or HD 186427 b is an extrasolar planet approximately  away in the constellation of Cygnus.  The planet was discovered orbiting the Sun-like star 16 Cygni B, one of two solar-mass components of the triple star system 16 Cygni in 1996. It orbits its star once every 799 days and was the first eccentric Jupiter and planet in a double star system to be discovered. The planet is abundant in lithium.

Discovery
In October 1996, the discovery of a planetary-mass companion to the star 16 Cygni B was announced, with a mass at least 1.68 times that of Jupiter. At the time, it had the highest orbital eccentricity of any known planet. The discovery was made by measuring the star's radial velocity.

As the inclination of the orbit cannot be directly measured and as no dynamic model of the system was then published, only a lower limit on the mass could then be determined.

Orbit

This high eccentricity may have been caused by tidal interactions in the binary star system, and the planet's orbit may vary chaotically between low and high-eccentricity states over a period of tens of millions of years.

Preliminary astrometric measurements in 2001 suggested the orbit of 16 Cygni Bb may be highly inclined with respect to our line of sight (at around 173°). However these measurements were later proved useful only for upper limits.

Physical characteristics
Because the planet has only been detected indirectly by measurements of its parent star, properties such as its radius, composition, and temperature are unknown.

A mathematical study in 2012 showed that a mass of about  would be most stable in this system. This would make the body a true planet.

The planet's highly eccentric orbit means the planet would experience extreme seasonal effects. Despite this, simulations suggest that an Earth-like moon, should it have formed in an orbit so close to the parent star, would be able to support liquid water at its surface for part of the year.

See also
 83 Leonis Bb
 HD 80606 b
 Lists of exoplanets

References

External links
 
 
 
 

Cygnus (constellation)
Exoplanets discovered in 1996
Exoplanets detected by radial velocity
Giant planets